Route 321 is a collector road in the Canadian province of Nova Scotia.

It is located in Cumberland County and connects Springhill at Route 2 with Port Howe at Trunk 6.

From Port Howe it travels southward following the eastern banks of River Philip to the town of Oxford. For the first while in the town it is known as Pugwash Road. It then turns to the west and is known as Water Street. Most of Water Street is also Route 204. Near the centre of Oxford the route turns southward and is known as Main Street where it has an interchange with Highway 104 (Trans Canada Highway). From there it travels southward to River Philip where it turns westward and heads to Trunk 2 in Springhill and is known locally as Main Street.

Communities
Springhill (known as Main Street)
Salt Springs
Valley Road
River Philip
Oxford (known as Water Street, Main Street and Upper Main Street)
Kolbec
Rockley
Riverview
Port Howe

Major intersections
Major Intersections/Junctions in order from Port Howe to Springhill.

Murray Road
Hansford Siding Road
Hansford Road
Water Street, Oxford
Birchwood Road, Oxford (Route 204)
Upper/Lower Main Street, Oxford (Route 301, and Route 204)
Black River Road, Oxford
Highway 104 Exit 6 (Trans Canada Highway).
Wyvern Road
Junction Road, Springhill (Route 2)

History

The section of Collector Highway 321 from Springhill to Oxford was designated as Trunk Highway 4 before the 1960s.

The section of Highway 321 from Oxford to Port Phillip was designated as Trunk Highway 21.

See also
List of Nova Scotia provincial highways

References

Map of Nova Scotia

Nova Scotia provincial highways
Roads in Cumberland County, Nova Scotia